The 2016 Supercopa de Chile was the fourth edition of this championship organised by the Asociación Nacional de Fútbol Profesional (ANFP).

The match was played between the 2015-16 Primera División Best-Champions Universidad Católica, and the 2015 Copa Chile Winners Universidad de Chile.

Road to the final

The two teams that disputed the Supercopa were Universidad Católica, that qualified as 
Clausura 2015-16 Champion and the Best Champion in the accumulated table, and Universidad de Chile, that qualified for the trophy dispute as the winner of the 2015 Copa Chile, winning Colo-Colo 1:1 (5:3 in penalties) at the Estadio La Portada.

Details

Champion

Statistics

References

Super
Club Deportivo Universidad Católica matches
Club Universidad de Chile matches